WCCM (1490 kHz) is an AM radio station broadcasting a Spanish CHR format. Licensed to Haverhill, Massachusetts, United States, the station is owned by Costa-Eagle Radio Ventures Limited Partnership, a partnership between Pat Costa and his chief investor, The Eagle-Tribune. WCCM also operates on two translator stations, W255DA (98.9 FM) in Salem, New Hampshire and W279DH (103.7 FM) in Haverhill.

History

The original WHAV
The Gazette, as early as 1944, planned an FM radio station, but had to wait for the end of wartime controls on new construction. John T. Russ announced on April 14, 1945, in the newspaper that "The Gazette long ago recognized the need of a Haverhill radio station and has long been in agreement with your premise that a newspaper is the logical proprietor of a broadcasting service, especially because the dissemination of news is the primary task of both press and radio." He defined WHAV’s mission during the inaugural March 16, 1947, broadcast:WHAV is going to be your station — a station for the people of Haverhill and the people in our surrounding towns. What concerns you directly, your lives and businesses, your community betterment will always get first priority on the WHAV airwaves.

Early obstacles
In its application to the Federal Communications Commission (FCC), The Gazette sought authority to construct a  tower on Ayer's Hill, the highest point of land in Haverhill. The station would transmit at a frequency of 46.5 MHz (a frequency then assigned to FM) and use a 1,000-watt Western Electric (AT&T) transmitter. At that time, Western Electric operated a manufacturing facility in the city. Russ predicted the station would cost $30,000 to $50,000, operate eight hours per day at the start and employ 11 people. One of the first delays in moving the station forward was a debate over the location of the tower. The Gazette indicated its selection of Ayer’s Hill was second to Silver Hill, a more centrally located city-owned parcel. Mayor Glynn and some alderman were willing to sell or lease the Silver Hill site, but others held out for using the site as a war memorial. J.R. Poppele, chief engineer of WOR, New York, conducted the original survey of sites. The Gazette ultimately bought the Silver Hill site at auction and the FCC conditionally granted the license December 10, 1945.

The war memorial, incidentally, was not constructed for another 40 years and was placed at another location. A major blow to the FM project came, however, when the FCC moved FM’s spectrum assignment from the 42–50 MHz band, allocated just before the war, to the 88–106 (later expanded to 108) MHz band. This had the effect of rendering 500,000 receivers obsolete. The Gazette responded by filing an application for a 250-watt AM station. “Mr. Russ said establishment of an AM station for local coverage does not mean the company has abandoned plans for its FM station. It was decided to apply for an AM station when it became apparent facilities were not going to be developed as fast as first believed possible for FM stations. The company plans to operate the AM station in conjunction with (what would now be a 20,000-watt) FM station when the later station is set up.”

Construction begins
The following month it was announced that impressive art deco studios would be constructed in downtown Haverhill, while a transmitting building would be built on Silver Hill. The first  of the tower would be for AM transmissions at 1,490 kHz, while an isolated  mast on the top would be erected for later FM transmission at 96.1 MHz. James B. Dunbar, commercial manager of the station, said The Gazette reached agreement with the City of Haverhill to swap its approved call letters of WHGF with the police department’s radio station, WHAV. Al Taylor, recruited from WCAU in Philadelphia (now WPHT), and a former newspaperman who had interviewed Adolf Hitler, would become the first program director, and Herbert W. Brown became chief engineer.

With transmission facilities completed, the inaugural broadcast of the AM station was set to take place March 16, 1947, from temporary studios downtown. Programs that day included a drama, "One Way Ticket," starring Fred Waring and Myrna Loy. The new studios, being designed by local architect Clinton F. Goodwin, would be ready later that year. In an interview during the early 1980s, Goodwin admitted he toured other stations, including WEEI in Boston (now WEZE) to determine how best to design the studios. That may explain why the station’s facilities convey a 1930s' appearance. The new one-story studio building contained two large studios – one containing the requisite piano – and a small announcer’s booth. There was also a large lobby with a double-paned window looking into the largest studio. Offices, just off the lobby, included a newsroom with a built-in bin to capture teletype paper. The basement contained record storage areas, an announcers’ lounge and the chief engineer’s office and work area.

WHAV-FM signs on
WHAV-FM finally went on the air April 14, 1948. WHAV-FM, as was the custom of the day, simply simulcasted the AM programs. Despite its earlier frequency announcement, the FM station was licensed on 92.5 MHz and is today known as WXRV. "FM broadcasting opens a new era for radio in Haverhill. It will give WHAV a second voice and will reach out into homes within a 50-mile radius of the city", The Gazette announced.

AM & FM simulcast
WHAV AM and FM joined the Continental Network, whose key station was WASH-FM in Washington, D.C., in time for President Harry S. Truman’s inauguration. The stations were the second in Massachusetts to become associated with Continental and the eighth in New England. Vaughn Monroe made an appearance on the stations during the grand opening of the new studio building to promote what would be a Big Band format, said Jackie Natalino, former music librarian, during a 1978 interview.  On September 29, 1950, WHAV announced it would join “the Liberty Broadcasting System – third largest network in America.” Liberty Broadcasting System began in 1948 with 42 affiliates and offered a sports format. It was operated by "The Old Scotchman," Gordon McLendon, out of KLIF, Dallas, Texas. McLendon and Ted Husing handled all football broadcasts for the network. McLendon, who pioneered radio’s transition into the television age, also hosted a show, "Great Days In Sports," which recreated great sports events from the past. WHAV joined Liberty just as the nationwide network grew to 240 affiliates with 10 hours of programs a day. At its peak, Liberty had 458 affiliates, but folded in 1952. It was a difficult time for radio, and WHAV-FM was not exempt.

Trouble begins
One major obstacle was The Gazette'''s mistaken idea that FM-receiving sets would be readily available after the war, according to Mrs. Natalino. To work around the problem, WHAV worked with local bus lines to have FM music piped into buses. However, she said, the FCC banned the action when bus riders complained of being “a captive audience”. The FCC also placed restrictions on simulcasting, requiring more of FM programs to be original and adding substantially to programming costs. As debts mounted, former News Director Edwin V. Johnson recalled, most of the staff was released. That left Johnson and an engineer playing all taped programs from the newly introduced Presto-brand commercial reel-to-reel tape recorders. Johnson, who joined the station in June 1951, changed his status to part-time, but remained until his retirement in 1985. WHAV-FM was dark by 1953 and its transmitter ended up 30 or so miles away at WCRB.

The virtually insolvent WHAV AM was sold in 1954 to Edward I. Cetlin and Henry R. and Morris Silver. The Silver brothers were owners of a successful Manchester bottling company and former owners of WFEA in Manchester, New Hampshire, and WKXL in Concord, New Hampshire. Free for the asking, WHAV AM’s new owners would revive 20,000-watt WHAV-FM on 92.5 MHz in 1959. Stereo did not come until the 1970s for WHAV-FM when it aired an automated "beautiful music" format. A power increase to an effective radiated power output of 50,000 watts was partly financed by  WPRO-FM, a Rhode Island station on an adjacent frequency (92.3 MHz) as a condition of its own power increase, as former Chief Engineer Ted Nahil once remarked.

Tom Bergeron, who would go on to host Hollywood Squares, America’s Funniest Home Videos and more recently, Dancing With The Stars, got his start on WHAV in the mid-1970s.

Later sales and switch to Spanish
In 1981, WHAV AM and FM were sold to Northeast Broadcasting Company in a distress sale stemming from an FCC investigation (initiated by copywriter Madolyn Roberts) into equal employment opportunity issues. The FM station went on to become WLYT and later WXRV. That owner is now known as Beanpot Broadcasting Corp., a Delaware corporation with principal offices in Bedford, New Hampshire. WHAV (AM) was turned over to Eastern Media of Methuen, Massachusetts in 1995. Eastern Media became known as Costa-Eagle Radio Ventures Ltd. when the owners of the Eagle-Tribune bought a 49 percent stake in the company and returned to broadcasting (the company previously owned WLAW and WLAW-FM). Costa-Eagle would go on to purchase WCCM from Curt Gowdy Broadcasting Corp. Similarly, the owners of the Eagle-Tribune formed ETP Ventures Inc. in 1998 and purchased the Haverhill Gazette. Ownership of WHAV and the Haverhill Gazette'' had come full circle. WHAV would dub itself "Radio Impacto" and air Spanish-language programs.

WHAV changed call letters to WCCM on September 23, 2002. On July 30, 2007, the station changed its call sign to WCEC, and on April 3, 2018, to WCCM.

The station has aired broadcasts of the Major League Baseball's Boston Red Sox from 2014 to 2019 and currently since 2022, with Uri Berenguer as the play-by-play announcer.

On August 4, 2021, WCCM changed formats from Spanish news/talk to Spanish CHR, branded as "LatinX 103.7".

Translator

Previous logo

References

External links

CCM (AM)
CCM (AM)
Haverhill, Massachusetts
Mass media in Essex County, Massachusetts
Radio stations established in 1947
1947 establishments in Massachusetts
Contemporary hit radio stations in the United States